Afton is an unincorporated community located in Madison Parish, Louisiana, United States.

References

Unincorporated communities in Madison Parish, Louisiana
Unincorporated communities in Louisiana